Strontium carbonate (SrCO3) is the carbonate salt of strontium that has the appearance of a white or grey powder. It occurs in nature as the mineral strontianite.

Chemical properties 
Strontium carbonate is a white, odorless, tasteless powder. Being a carbonate, it is a weak base and therefore is reactive with acids. It is otherwise stable and safe to work with. It is practically insoluble in water (0.0001 g per 100 ml). The solubility is increased significantly if the water is saturated with carbon dioxide, to 0.1 g per 100 ml.

Preparation 
Other than the natural occurrence as a mineral, strontium carbonate is prepared synthetically in one of two processes, both of which start with naturally occurring celestine, a mineral form of  strontium sulfate (SrSO4). In the "black ash" process, celesite is roasted with coke at 1100–1300 °C to form strontium sulfide. The sulfate is reduced, leaving the sulfide:

SrSO4 + 2 C → SrS +  2 CO2

A mixture of strontium sulfide with either carbon dioxide gas or sodium carbonate then leads to formation of a precipitate of strontium carbonate.

SrS + H2O + CO2 → SrCO3 + H2S
SrS + Na2CO3 → SrCO3 + Na2S

In the "direct conversion" or double-decomposition method, a mixture of celesite and sodium carbonate is treated with steam to form strontium carbonate with substantial amounts of undissolved other solids. This material is mixed with hydrochloric acid, which dissolves the strontium carbonate to form a solution of strontium chloride. Carbon dioxide or sodium carbonate is then used to re-precipitate strontium carbonate, as in the black-ash process.

Uses 

The most common use is as an inexpensive colorant in fireworks. Strontium and its salts emit a brilliant red color in flame. Unlike other strontium salts, the carbonate salt is generally preferred because of its cost and the fact that it is not hygroscopic. Its ability to neutralize acid is also very helpful in pyrotechnics.  Another similar application is in road flares.

Strontium carbonate is used for electronic applications. It is used for manufacturing color television receivers to absorb electrons resulting from the cathode.

It is used in the preparation of iridescent glass, luminous paint, strontium oxide, and strontium salts and in refining sugar and certain drugs.

It is widely used in the ceramics industry as an ingredient in glazes. It acts as a flux and also modifies the color of certain metallic oxides. It has some properties similar to barium carbonate.

It is also used in the manufacturing of strontium ferrites for permanent magnets which are used in loudspeakers and door magnets.

Strontium carbonate is also used for making some superconductors such as BSCCO and also for electroluminescent materials where it is first calcined into SrO and then mixed with sulfur to make SrS:x where x is typically europium.  This is the "blue/green" phosphor which is sensitive to frequency and changes from lime green to blue.  Other dopants can also be used such as gallium, or yttrium to get a yellow/orange glow instead.

Because of its status as a weak Lewis base, strontium carbonate can be used to produce many different strontium compounds by simple use of the corresponding acid.

Microbial precipitation
The cyanobacteria Calothrix, Synechococcus and Gloeocapsa can precipitate strontian calcite in groundwater. The strontium exists as strontianite in solid solution within the host calcite with the strontium content of up to one percent.

References

External links 
International Chemical Safety Card 1695

Strontium compounds
Carbonates
Pyrotechnic colorants